Boqueixón is a municipality in the province of A Coruña, in the autonomous community of Galicia in northwestern Spain. It has a population of 4,445 inhabitants (INE, 2008).

References

Municipalities in the Province of A Coruña